The R584 road is a regional road in Ireland. It is a road in west County Cork.

The R584 travels southwest from the N22 near Macroom on the new N22 bypass via Ballingeary and following the course of the River Lee (including Lough Allua) to reach Gougane Barra. Gougane Barra is a scenic area including a Forest Park and Gougane Lake, the source of the Lee. The section of the road near Macroom provides access to The Gearagh, a River Lee nature reserve of rare alluvial forest, unique in Ireland. From Gougane Barra, the road travels through the Pass of Keimaneigh in the Shehy Mountains and onward to end at the N71 at Ballylickey.

References

Regional roads in the Republic of Ireland
Roads in County Cork